Polish census of 2011 was a census in Poland taken from 1 April to 30 June 2011.

Results

Population by voivodeships
Source:

National/ethnic identity
The Census included two questions regarding national and ethnic identity:
What is your nation? ("Jaka jest Pana/Pani narodowość?") The census provided the following definition: "Nationality (national or ethnic affiliation) is a declared (based on subjective feeling) individual feature of the person, which expresses their emotional, cultural or genealogical relationship (due to the origin of parents) with a specific nation".
Do you feel an affiliation with another nation or ethnic group? ("Czy odczuwa Pan/Pani przynależność także do innego narodu lub wspólnoty etnicznej?") 

93.8% of surveyed declared Polish ethnicity; 3,8% other and 2,4% gave no answer. 
99.7% of those surveyed declared Polish citizenship; 0.2% declared other citizenship.

Significant ethnic minorities 

Other ethnic groups in Poland include:

See also
Demographics of Poland

References

 Wyniki Narodowego Spisu Powszechnego Ludności i Mieszkań 2011 w zakresie deklarowanej narodowości oraz języka używanego w domu

External links
 NSP 2011

2011
2011 in Poland
2011 censuses